Move Me may refer to:
 Move Me (film), a 2003 Danish comedy film
 Move Me (Nazareth album), 1994
 Move Me (Midge Ure album), 2000
 "Move Me" (Lewis OfMan and Carly Rae Jepsen song), 2022 standalone single
 "Move Me", Charli XCX song from Crash (Charli XCX album)
 "Move Me", Gucci Mane song from Woptober II